The International Ski Federation (FIS) Alpine Skiing World Cup is the premier circuit for alpine skiing competition. The inaugural FIS World Cup season launched  in January 1967 and this 51st season began on 22 October 2016 in Sölden, Austria, and concluded in the United States at Aspen on 19 March 2017. The biennial World Championships interrupted the tour in early February in Saint Moritz, Switzerland. The season-ending finals in March were held in North America for the first time in two decades: the last finale in the U.S. was in 1997 at Vail.

Chief Race Director for the WC Tour, Markus Waldner, offered his pre-season thoughts on the pending 2016-17 tour in an early October interview. He addressed: early season scheduling and weather considerations, the growing global interest in alpine skiing beyond the core market in Europe and Scandinavia, the balance between what disciplines were scheduled and the marketability concerns each present, course construction that is safely competitive and manages risk, and a new change to regulation that allows top qualifiers to pick their starting position across a much wider range of bibs between 1 and 19.

Former overall World Cup champion Tina Maze of Slovenia, who missed the entire 2015-16 World Cup season, retired in January 2017. At the end of the season, former two-time overall World Cup champion Bode Miller of the United States, who had not raced in the last two seasons, also officially retired.
Summary

Men

Calendar

Rankings

Overall

Downhill

Super G

Giant slalom

Slalom

Alpine combined

Women 
Summary

The women typically have had technical events in the U.S. in late November in Colorado at Aspen, but instead stopped this season in Vermont at Killington for its first effort as a World Cup venue. The most recent World Cup races in the Eastern U.S. were over a quarter century earlier, in March 1991 at Waterville Valley Resort, New Hampshire  and the last World Cup races in Vermont were in 1978 at Stratton Mountain Resort. The women also had two Olympic venue orientation speed events in South Korea at the Jeongseon Alpine Centre in March, which produced identical podiums led by Sofia Goggia.

Injuries continued to affect several of the top racers.  Two-time overall champion Anna Veith (née Fenninger) and three-time overall champion Lindsey Vonn both missed the first half of the season due to injuries suffered during the previous season, although both returned by mid-January and competed in the World Championships in early February. However, Veith then missed the end of the season as well to recover further from her injuries.  In addition, defending overall champion Lara Gut suffered a season-ending injury during the World Championships, costing her a chance to repeat.

At the end of the season, Mikaela Shiffrin, who also won the slalom discipline for the fourth time and was second in the giant slalom,  became the third American woman and fifth American overall to win the overall World Cup championship, joining men's champions Phil Mahre and Bode Miller and women's champions Tamara McKinney and Vonn.  Additionally, women's Super G champion Tina Weirather became a second-generation discipline champion, as her father (Harti Weirather) was downhill discipline champion in 1981 and both her mother (Hanni Wenzel) and uncle (Andreas Wenzel) won the overall World Cup championship. Weirather and her mother thus became the first mother-daughter pair to win season trophies in World Cup competition.

Calendar

Rankings

Overall

Downhill

Super G

Giant slalom

Slalom

Alpine combined

Alpine team event

Nations Cup 

Overall

Men

Women

Prize money 

Top-5 Men

Top-5 Women

References

External links 

 
Test events for the 2018 Winter Olympic and Paralympic Games
2016–17
World Cup
World Cup